Helen Priscilla Rabagliati, MBE (1851–1934) was a local philanthropist and campaigner for improvements in health, women's condition and political change.

She was the daughter of Duncan McLaren and Priscilla Bright (sister of John Bright. She is a sister of Charles McLaren, 1st Baron Aberconway and Walter McLaren.

Her most significant and enduring contributions to Bradford were education and public health. She founded an early hospice, St Catherine's and supported a maternity home for young unsupported women, St. Monica's. After 1900 she was very prominent in West Riding Conservative women's politics. 

During World War 1, she was president of the Ilkley Ladies' Belgian Hospitality Committee. In recognition of the "kind help and valuable assistance personally given to the Belgian refugees and Belgian soldiers during the war" she was awarded the  Medaille de la Reine Elisabeth by the King of the Belgians.  

Helen Priscilla McLaren was born on 28 October 1851. She was the daughter of Duncan McLaren and Priscilla Bright. She married Andrea Rabagliati on 25 May 1877. They had five children including Euan Rabagliati, Duncan Silvestro Rabagliati OBE, Catherine Rabagliati MBE (Mayor of Paddington) and Herman Victor Rabagliati. She died on 3 January 1934 at age 82.
Helen Rabagliati was invested as a Member, Order of the British Empire (MBE).

Curiously, Helen increasingly took the opposite political viewpoint of that of her family.

See also
Ladies National Association for the Repeal of the Contagious Diseases Acts

References

Bradford Telegraph and Argus: Lecture recalls politician Helen.  
Enigmatic Ilkley politician remembered in special lecture 
Charles Mosley, editor, Burke's Peerage and Baronetage, 106th edition, 2 volumes (Crans, Switzerland: Burke's Peerage (Genealogical Books) Ltd, 1999), volume 1, page 3.
Caroline Brown & Mark Hunnebell, Ilkley and the Great War, Amberley Publishing, 2014

British philanthropists
People from Bradford
1851 births
1934 deaths
Members of the Order of the British Empire